Xiadong Township is a rural township in Chaling County, Hunan Province, People's Republic of China.

Cityscape
The township is divided into 18 villages, the following areas: Toupu Village, Rushiping Village, Huangtang Village, Chayuan Village, Fengshu Village, Tiaoxin Village, Xiaoche Village, Guanghui Village, Dongshanba Village, Erpu Village, Qiaobian Village, Xintian Village, Guanpu Village, Jinxing Village, Qixin Village, Mengxi Village, Changle Village, and Silian Village.

References

External links

Divisions of Chaling County